TRANSPAC or Trans-pacific cable (TPC) is a series of undersea cables under the Pacific Ocean.

Transpac 1
TRANSPAC-1 (TPC-1) was laid by AT&T's cable ship C.S. Long Lines. and opened on June 19, 1964. It connected Hawaii, Midway Atoll, Wake Island, Guam, and Japan. A branch from Guam to the Philippines was completed in December 1964. This cable connected with HAW-1 to complete the telephone connection to the mainland United States. It had a capacity of 142 channels. TRANSPAC-1 was part of the network that supported the Apollo 11 moon landing mission in 1969.

Transpac 2
In 1975, Transpac-2 (TPC-2) connected Guam, Taiwan, Korea, Hong Kong and Singapore with 845 channels.

Transpac 3
Transpac 3 (TPC-3), which went into service April 18, 1989, increased capacity to 3780 channels. This was the first fiber-optic cable across the Pacific, and it replaced the two existing copper cables (Transpac 1 and Transpac2) as well as satellite circuits being used at the time. It was laid from Point Arena, California to 
Makaha, Hawaii, from which it goes to an undersea branching unit and splits to Chikura, Japan and Tanguisson, Guam.

TPC-5CN
The TPC-5CN cable network is a 25,000 km fiberoptic ring, carrying 5 Gbit/s in each channel.

History

See also
 Commercial Pacific Cable Company
 Submarine communications cable

References

Submarine communications cables in the Pacific Ocean